For Greater Glory: The True Story of Cristiada, also known as Cristiada and as Outlaws, is a 2012 epic historical war drama film   directed by Dean Wright and written by Michael Love, based on the events of the Cristero War. It stars Andy García, Eva Longoria, Oscar Isaac, Rubén Blades, Peter O'Toole (in his last film appearance released in his lifetime), and Bruce Greenwood. The film is the directorial debut for Wright, a veteran visual effects supervisor on films including The Two Towers (2002) and The Return of the King (2003), and was released on June 1, 2012.

Plot
The film opens with screen titles describing the anti-Catholic provisions of the 1917 Constitution of Mexico. Civil war erupts when newly elected Mexican President Plutarco Elías Calles (Rubén Blades) begins a violent crackdown against the country's Catholic faithful. The film depicts the carnage by showing churches being set on fire, Catholic priests murdered, and countless faithful peasants killed and having their bodies publicly hanged on telegraph poles as a warning to others.

The story shifts to Father Christopher (Peter O’Toole), a Catholic priest, who is ruthlessly murdered by the Federales. A 13-year-old boy, José Luis Sánchez (Mauricio Kuri), witnesses the killing. Driven by love for his Faith and anger against the injustices committed against Fr. Christopher and the Church in Mexico, he joins the rebels, the Cristeros ("soldiers for Christ") fighting against Calles. Their battle cry is "¡Viva Cristo Rey!" ("Long live Christ the King"). The rebel leader, retired General Enrique Gorostieta (Andy García), an agnostic, takes an interest in young José, who soon becomes his protégé. While fighting against the Federales, José is later captured in a firefight and tortured to force him to renounce his belief in God. When he resolutely defends his faith, he is executed. The next year, Gorostieta is killed in a battle at Jalisco after he becomes a Catholic. In 1929, however, agreements were made to restore religious freedoms. Pope Benedict XVI beatified José in 2005, along with 12 other martyrs of the religious persecution.

Cast
 Andy García as Enrique Gorostieta
 Eva Longoria as Tulita Gorostieta 
 Mauricio Kuri as José Sánchez del Río
 Peter O'Toole as Father Christopher
 Oscar Isaac as Victoriano "El Catorce" Ramírez
 Santiago Cabrera as Father Vega
 Eduardo Verástegui as Anacleto González Flores
 Rubén Blades as President Plutarco Elías Calles
 Nestor Carbonell as Mayor Picazo
 Catalina Sandino Moreno as Adriana
 Bruce Greenwood as Ambassador Dwight Morrow
 Bruce McGill as President Calvin Coolidge
 Adrian Alonso as Lalo
 Joaquín Garrido as Minister Amaro
 Karyme Lozano as Doña María del Río
 Alma Martinez as Señora Vargas
 Andrés Montiel as Florentino Vargas
 Roger Cudney as Secretary of State Frank B. Kellogg

Production

The film is based on The Cristero Rebellion, the 1976 chronicle of the war written by French historian Jean Meyer who resides in Mexico.

Filming started in May 2010 and shot for 12 weeks. Production took place between 31 May 2010 and 16 August 2010. The film was shot in Mexico City, Durango, Zacatecas, San Luis Potosí, Tlaxcala and Puebla. Including an ecological reserve, Sierra de Órganos National Park in the town of Sombrerete, Mexico.

At one point the director recreates a famous photograph of the bodies of executed Cristeros hanging from telephone poles, but they are seen in the film from a moving train.

Release
The film had a robust opening in Mexico taking first place in gross admissions at the box office, and second in total receipts, behind Titanic 3D. As of May 11, 2012, it had grossed $2.2 million.

Reception
The film has received negative reviews, noting its performances and ambition but criticizing the screenplay and presentation of events. As of 2021, it holds a 35% rating on Metacritic based on 17 critics, and a 20% rating on Rotten Tomatoes based on 49 reviews. The latter site states: "It has laudable aspirations, but For Greater Glory ultimately fails to fulfill its goals due to an overstuffed script, thinly written characters, and an overly simplified dramatization of historical events."

Roger Ebert of the Chicago Sun-Times gave the film two and half stars, and concluded that "it is well-made, yes, but has such pro-Catholic tunnel vision I began to question its view of events." Frank Scheck of The Hollywood Reporter criticized the film as being 'melodramatic' and 'overlong', but noted that 'Despite its profusion of violent battle sequences, the film is most effective in its quieter moments, such as the scenes in which Calles warily negotiates with the American ambassador (Bruce Greenwood) who is mainly intent on preserving U.S. oil interests'. Nathan Rabin of  The A.V. Club panned the film and called it, 'an endless, plodding educational tool of unusual bluntness and dull force, a blood-soaked primer on intolerance and religious persecution that would benefit from even the faintest tinge of moral ambiguity or narrative sophistication.'

In more positive reviews, Stephen Holden of The New York Times described the film as an "old-fashioned, Hollywood-style epic" and said that it compared favorably to Christian mega-hits of the 1950s such as The Robe. He was most satisfied with Dean Wright, referring to his direction as "impressively spacious." The composer James Horner also scored high marks for his score, which Holden found "uplifting without being syrupy" and which set an "inspirational mood." Phil Boatwright of the "Baptist Press" called the film "a compelling, thoughtful homage to religious freedom" and said that it brought back memories of El Cid and  A Man for All Seasons.

According to Steven D. Greydanus of Decent Films, For Greater Glory may help to change the obscurity of the Cristero War in the United States. He observed that the film is "one of the most lavish and ambitious films ever produced in Mexico" and "a sweeping, handsome epic with strong performances, solid production values and magnificent locations across Mexico." However, he found the screenplay overbearing and would have liked to have seen more character development.

Accolades
The movie received the following awards and nominations:

At ALMA Awards 2012, got nominations:

Favorite Movie
Favorite Movie Actor - Andy García 
Favorite Movie Actress - Drama/Adventure - Eva Longoria 
Favorite Movie Actor - Supporting Role - Oscar Isaac 
Favorite Movie Actor - Supporting Role - Rubén Blades

At Ariel Awards 2013:

Nominated
Silver Ariel	Best Art Direction (Mejor Diseño de Arte)
Salvador Parra

At Image Awards 2013:

Nominated
Image Award	Outstanding International Motion Picture

At Movieguide Awards 2013

Won
Faith and Freedom Award	
Won
Grace Award - Most Inspiring Performance in Movies - Andy Garcia 
Nominated
Epiphany Prize - Most Inspiring Movie
Nominated
Grace Award - Most Inspiring Performance in Movies
Mauricio Kuri

See also

Saints of the Cristero War
Cristero Museum

References

Sources
 Ferreira, Cornelia R. Blessed José Luis Sánchez del Rio: Cristero Boy Martyr, biography (2006, Canisius Books)

External links

Films about Catholic priests
2012 war drama films
Films about Catholicism
War epic films
Drama films based on actual events
2012 films
Films scored by James Horner
Cultural depictions of Calvin Coolidge
Mexican war drama films
2012 directorial debut films
2012 drama films
2010s English-language films
2010s Mexican films
English-language Mexican films
English-language drama films